The 2010–11 Penn State Nittany Lions basketball team represented Pennsylvania State University. Head Coach Ed DeChellis was in his eighth season with the team. The team played its home games in University Park, Pennsylvania, at the Bryce Jordan Center, which has a capacity of 15,000, for the twelfth consecutive season. They finished with a record of 19–15 overall, 9–9 in Big Ten play for a 4 way tie for fourth place. They lost in the championship game to Ohio State in the 2011 Big Ten Conference men's basketball tournament.  They receive an at-large bid in the 2011 NCAA Division I men's basketball tournament, which is their first time since 2001.  They lost in the first round to Temple on a last-second buzzer beater. As of 2022, this is the most recent time the Nittany Lions qualified for the tournament.

Current coaching staff

Roster

Schedule and Results 

|-
!colspan=9 style=| Exhibition

|-
!colspan=9 style=| Regular Season

|-
!colspan=9 style=| Big Ten tournament

|-
!colspan=9 style=| NCAA tournament

References

Penn State
Penn State Nittany Lions basketball seasons
Penn State